The 72nd season of the Campeonato Gaúcho kicked off on July 26, 1992 and ended in December 23, 1992. Twenty-two teams participated. Holders Internacional beat Grêmio in the finals and won their 31st title. No teams were relegated.

Participating teams

System 
The championship would have three stages:

 First phase: The twenty-two teams were divided into two groups of eleven, and played each other in a single round-robin system. The four best teams in each group qualified to the Second phase.
 Second phase: The eight remaining teams were divided into two groups of four, in which each team played the teams of its own group in a double round-robin system. The best teams in each group qualified to the Finals.
 Finals: The group winners played each other in two matches to define the champions.

Championship

First phase

Group 1

Group 2

Second phase

Group 1

Group 2

Finals 

|}

References 

Campeonato Gaúcho seasons
Gaúcho